Xocó (Chocó, Shokó) is a dead and poorly attested language or languages of Brazil that is not known to be related to other languages. It is known from three populations: Xokó (Chocó) in Sergipe, Kariri-Xocó (Kariri-Shoko, Cariri-Chocó) in Alagoas, and Xukuru-Kariri (Xucuru-Kariri, Xucuru-Cariri) in Alagoas. It is not clear if these were one language or three.  It is only known from a few dozen words from one Kariri-Xoco elder and three Xukuru-Kariri elders in 1961.

It was originally spoken along the Piancó River is an area that is now a suburb of Porto Real do Colégio.

In ISO encoding, the language was conflated with the Kariri family as ISO 639-3 [kzw] 'Karirí-Xocó'; Ethnologue does not indicate if this was a conscious decision.

Other languages with this name
Xoco, Xukuru, and Kariri are all common generic names in the region.  See Kariri languages.

Vocabulary

Pompeu (1958)
Chocó (Xocó) vocabulary collected in Colégio, Alagoas:

{| class="wikitable"
! Portuguese gloss (original) !! English gloss (translated) !! Chocó
|-
| fogo || fire || atsá, tsá
|-
| água || water || taká
|-
| cachimbo || smoking pipe || pupú
|-
| homem || man || mãjikêô
|}

Note: Loukotka (1968) transcribes 'man' as mazyikeːoː.

Meader (1978)
Five Xukuru-Kariri word lists collected by Menno Kroeker in Alagoas in 1961 are published in Meader (1978).

Words recorded from an elderly male pajé (shaman) in Porto Real do Colégio:

{| class="wikitable sortable"
! Portuguese gloss (original) !! English gloss (translated) !! Xukuru-Kariri
|-
| chuva || rain || sèhóιdzˈὲʔà
|-
| fumo || smoke || bˈázè
|-
| lua || moon || kˈriũavi
|-
| mandioca || manioc || gˈrïgɔ
|-
| menino || boy || semˈentiais
|-
| mulher || woman || spˈikwais
|-
| rio || river || oːpˈara
|-
| sol || sun || kràšùtˈó
|-
| terra || earth || aːtsιhˈi
|-
| vento || wind || mə̀núsˈi
|-
| batata || potato || dˈódsákà
|-
| cachimbo || smoking pipe || catʔokə
|-
| Colégio (cidade) || Colégio (city) || simidˈo
|-
| deus || God || sõsˈeh
|-
| dinheiro || money || mεrεkiˈa
|-
| farinha || flour || tˈónà
|-
| feijão || bean || nˈódsákà
|-
| gado || cattle || krˈazɔ
|-
| galinha || chicken || cáːkìʔ
|-
| luz || light || kápˈòèr
|-
| ovelha || sheep || sábˈòèR
|-
| peru || turkey || brεfˈεlia
|-
| porco || pig || korˈe
|-
| soldado || soldier || òlˈófò
|}

Words recorded from Alfredo Caboquim, a pajé (shaman), and his brother Miguel Caboquim in Fazenda Conta, Palmeira dos Índios, Alagoas:

{| class="wikitable sortable"
! Portuguese gloss (original) !! English gloss (translated) !! Xukuru-Kariri
|-
| carne de boi || beef ||  ˈbeiñõ
|-
| chuva || rain || šualya
|-
| dê-me fogo para o cigarro || Give me fire for the cigarette. || àòšˈínòʔ ìnˈísìà sˈèdàià
|-
| lua / moça || moon / girl || seːya
|-
| mãe || mother || isá
|-
| milho || corn || matˈilya
|-
| não (mentira) || no (lie) || eːyo
|-
| nariz || nose || nˈəmbi
|-
| pai || dad || étfˈὲ
|-
| anzol || fish hook || èáyˈɔ̀ / alyɔ (?)
|-
| batata || potato || dˈotsakə
|-
| bebida de mandioca || manioc drink || gúlížˈɔ̀ (gálížˈɔ̀)
|-
| bode || goat || filˈisakə
|-
| boi || ox || léfétˈìa
|-
| cachorro || dog || it(ə)lˈo
|-
| cachorro de brinquedo || toy dog || ìt(ə)lˈó tə̀núnšweˈì
|-
| dança indígena || indigenous dance || áʔálˈèndà
|-
| deus || God || àʔúdéódályˈà
|-
| estrangeiro || foreigner, stranger || kóbˈè
|-
| farinha || flour || tititsia
|-
| feijão || bean || nˈatsakə
|-
| folga dos índios || indigenous holiday || arikulilyˈa / kèːšátíkáˈya (?)
|-
| fumando cachimbo || to smoke a pipe || puèpùˈa
|-
| galinha || chicken || sˈetˈáduàlyà
|-
| gato || cat || atašeškia
|-
| índia || indigenous woman || sétsˈòníká
|-
| lagarto || lizard || šˈua atˈežo / tˈeyu (?)
|-
| mulato || mulatto || mulatι̃nkya
|-
| negro || black person || tùpíə̃̀nkyà
|-
| padre || father || ĩŋklaˈišoa
|-
| (pausa) – considerando as palavras || pause (when thinking of words) || ə̃hə̃
|-
| peru || turkey || aotˈisakə
|-
| porco || pig || àːlˈé
|-
| praia (?) || beach (?) || práiˈà
|-
| quarto de homem || men's quarters || subεbˈe
|-
| como vai? || How are you? || àkàkˈáumà
|-
| vou bem, obrigado || I am fine, thank you. || íkàkˈə́
|-
| senhor || sir || ˈĩŋklai
|-
| vamos embora || Let's go. || òːšˈóuà
|-
| homem mais velho || older man || tošˈa / aošιnə̃ŋklainšoa taškiˈa
|}

Words recorded from an elderly farmer in Fazenda Conta, Palmeira dos Índios, Alagoas:

{| class="wikitable sortable"
! Portuguese gloss (original) !! English gloss (translated) !! Xukuru-Kariri
|-
| água || water || oiyˈa
|-
| carne de boi || beef || aòtˈísiə̀
|-
| fogo || fire || tóˈè
|-
| aguardente || aguardente || kóšákˈà
|-
| bode || goat || sákúlˈὲ, sákúlˈègò
|-
| bonito || beautiful || atilišˈĩ
|-
| brancos || white people || ə̃́nkláʔˈì
|-
| cabelo crespo (de negro) || curly hair (of black people) || tuʔˈĩ
|-
| café || coffee || tópˈì
|-
| cigarro || cigarette || àlísíˈàx
|-
| índio || indigenous man / person || sέtsˈò
|-
| mãe de Jesus || mother of Jesus (Virgin Mary) || kwə́ntópˈə̃̀ atoayˈə
|-
| negra || black man || (i)atuayˈa
|-
| negro || black woman || túpíyˈà
|-
| porco || pig || šíə̃̀ntì
|-
| tatu || armadillo || rṍmpˈə̀tì
|}

Words recorded from João Candido da Silva, a young farmer in Fazenda Conta, Palmeira dos Índios, Alagoas:

{| class="wikitable"
! Portuguese gloss (original) !! English gloss (translated) !! Xukuru-Kariri
|-
| fumo || smoke || šíšúˈà
|-
| dança || dance || arikurˈi
|-
| deus || God || dédùˈá / íŋklàˈíx
|}

Words recorded from José Fermino da Silva of Palmeira dos Índios, Alagoas:

{| class="wikitable sortable"
! Portuguese gloss (original) !! English gloss (translated) !! Xukuru-Kariri
|-
| água || water || óiyˈàh
|-
| fogo para o cigarro || fire for cigarette || tòˈéh asendendisi / tòˈéh pàrə̀ns-ˈíáx
|-
| batata || potato || dˈótsákà
|-
| branco || white person || kràiʔˈé
|-
| caboclo || caboclo || sǽtsˈùx
|-
| cachimbo || smoking pipe || pua / pue
|-
| deus || God || dèdˈúa
|-
| feijão || bean || nˈótsákà
|-
| negra || black || kòbˈéh
|-
| obrigado || thank you || bèréˈɔ́
|-
| pau (claraíba) || claraíba tree || frˈéžɔ̀ìž
|-
| pau (d'arco) || Tabebuia tree || paìpˈέ
|}

References

Extinct languages of South America
Unclassified languages of South America
Indigenous languages of Northeastern Brazil